Identidad is a sculpture by Marta Gilbert, installed in Zona Romántica, Puerto Vallarta, in the Mexican state of Jalisco. Gilbert donated the bust to the city, which was unveiled in 2019.

References

2019 establishments in Mexico
2019 sculptures
Busts in Mexico
Outdoor sculptures in Puerto Vallarta
Sculptures of women in Mexico